The 2019 Campeonato Nacional de Fútbol de Cuba is the 108th season of the Campeonato Nacional de Fútbol de Cuba, the top division football competition in Cuba. The season began on 19 January 2019.

Oriental

Group A Occidental

Group B Oriental

Final stage

Final stage stadiums:

References

Campeonato Nacional de Fútbol de Cuba seasons
Cuba
1